Charles Kenneth Thomson (January 7, 1899 – January 26, 1967) was an American character actor active on stage and on film during the silent and early sound film eras.

Early years
Born in Pittsburgh, Thomson was the son of Edith Taylor Thomson, a concert manager, who raised him alone after his father died when Kenneth was seven years old. As a youth, he worked as a copy boy at the Pittsburgh Leader and helped to distribute publicity material for concerts that his mother arranged. Later, he worked for a steel company and an insurance company

During World War I, Thomson was in the United States Marine Corps, with his service including being a gunner on the U. S. Frederick cruiser. At the war's end, he went to the Norfolk Navy Yard until he was discharged. After returning to Pittsburgh, he re-enrolled at Carnegie Institute of Technology (CIT), He acted in plays at the institute and graduated from CIT's Drama School,

Career
After graduation from CIT, Thomson worked as an extra and assistant stage manager with a stock theater company in Lakewood, Maine, for several summers. He also acted with Ethel Barrymore in a touring production of Declassee. During subsequent winters he acted in plays that included Shavings and The Emperor Jones. During a winter on the Pacific coast, he acted in a touring production of Three Wise Fools. He later acted with a stock company headed by Margaret Anglin.

Following his west-coast performance in The Rivals, Thomson declined a contract offer to work in films from Cecil B. DeMille, Returning to New York, Thomson acted in Hush Money with Henry Miller's company., following which he accepted a two-year contract offer from DeMille.

Thomson and his wife, Alden Gay, were founding members of the Screen Actors Guild. The group was founded after meetings held at the Thomsons' home during 1933. He was the group's secretary and its magazine's managing editor.

During Thomson's 12-year career in front of the camera, he appeared in over 60 films. After appearing in several Broadway plays during the early and mid-1920s, Thomson would make his film debut with a starring role in 1926's Risky Business. Over the next four years, he appeared in more than a dozen films, in either starring or featured roles. In 1930 alone he would appear in 10 films, half of which were in starring roles, such as Lawful Larceny, which also starred Bebe Daniels and Lowell Sherman (who also directed), and Reno, whose other stars were Ruth Roland and Montagu Love;  the other half had him in featured roles as in A Notorious Affair, starring Billie Dove, Basil Rathbone, and Kay Francis. During the rest of the 1930s, he appeared in numerous films, mostly in either supporting or featured roles, such as The Little Giant (1933), starring Edward G. Robinson and Mary Astor, and Hop-Along Cassidy (1935), starring William Boyd; although he occasionally had a starring role, as in opposite Harold Lloyd in 1932's Movie Crazy.

On Broadway, Thomson appeared in The Great Broxopp (1921), The Czarina (1922), and Hush Money (1926).

Personal life and death
Thomson married actress Alden Gay in 1928. On January 26, 1967, Thomson died in Hollywood Presbyterian Hospital at age 67.

Filmography

(Per AFI database)

Corporal Kate (1926) as Jack Clarke
Risky Business (1926) as Ted Pyncheon M.D.
Man Bait (1927) as Gerald Sanford
Turkish Delight (1927) as Donald Sims
White Gold (1927) as Alec Carson
Almost Human (1927) as John Livingston
The King of Kings (1927) as Lazarus
The Secret Hour (1928) as Joe
The Street of Illusion (1928) as Curtis Drake
The Bellamy Trial (1929) as Stephen Bellamy
The Broadway Melody (1929) as Jacques Warriner (uncredited)
The Careless Age (1929) as Owen
The Girl from Havana (1929) as William Dane
The Letter (1929)
Say It with Songs (1929) as Arthur Phillips
The Veiled Woman (1929) as Dr. Donald Ross
Children of Pleasure (1930) as Rod Peck
The Doorway to Hell (1930) as Captain of academy
Just Imagine (1930) as MT-3
Lawful Larceny (1930) as Andrew Dorsey
A Notorious Affair (1930) as Dr. Alan Pomeroy
The Other Tomorrow (1930) as Nort Larrison
Reno (1930) as Richard Belden
Sweet Mama (1930) as Joe Palmer
Sweethearts on Parade (1930) as Hendricks
Wild Company (1930) as Joe Hardy
Bad Company (1931) as Barnes - Henchman
Murder at Midnight (1931) as Jim Kennedy
Woman Hungry (1931) as Leonard Temple
Up for Murder (1931) as William's Daughter's Boyfriend (uncredited)
Thirteen Women (1932) as Mr. Cousins (uncredited)
Movie Crazy (1932) as Vance
Man Wanted (1932) as Fred 'Freddie' Ames
The Famous Ferguson Case (1932) as Bob Parks
Her Mad Night (1932) as Schuyler Durkin
70,000 Witnesses (1932) as Dr. Collins
Fast Life (1932) as Mr. Williams
By Whose Hand? (1932) as Chambers
Lawyer Man (1932) as Dr. Frank Gresham (uncredited)
The Little Giant (1933) as John Stanley
Female (1933) as Red
Daring Daughters (1933) as Alan Preston
Son of a Sailor (1933) as Williams
From Headquarters (1933) as Gordon Bates
Jungle Bride (1933) as John Franklin
Sitting Pretty (1933) as Norman Lubin (uncredited)
Hold Me Tight (1933) as Dolan (uncredited)
Gallant Lady (1933) as Minor Role (scenes deleted)
Behold My Wife! (1934) as Jim Curson
In Old Santa Fe (1934) as Matt Korber - alias Mr. Chandler
Cross Streets (1934) as Mort Talbot
Many Happy Returns (1934) as Motion Picture Director
Change of Heart (1934) as Howard Jackson
Behind the Green Lights (1935) as Charles T. 'Ritzy' Conrad
Manhattan Butterfly (1935) as A Gangster
Whispering Smith Speaks (1935) as J. Wesley Hunt
Hop-Along Cassidy (1935) as Jack Anthony
Blackmailer (1936) as Mr. Porter
With Love and Kisses (1936) as Gangster
Jim Hanvey, Detective (1937) as W.B. Elwood
Criminal Lawyer (1937) as First Trial Witness (uncredited)

References

External links

Kenneth Thomson at the AFI Catalog of Feature Films

Screen Actors Guild
1899 births
1967 deaths
Male actors from Pittsburgh
American male silent film actors
20th-century American male actors
American male stage actors